Rogues' Gallery is a 1944 American mystery film directed by Albert Herman and starring Frank Jenks, Robin Raymond and H.B. Warner. It was produced by the Poverty Row studio Producers Releasing Corporation. The film's sets were designed by the art director Paul Palmentola.

Synopsis
Newspaper reporters Patsy Clark and Eddie Porter get entangled in a murder investigation and the theft of an innovative electronic device.

Cast 
Frank Jenks as Eddie Porter
Robin Raymond as Patsy Clark
H.B. Warner as Professor Reynolds
Ray Walker as Jimmy Foster
Davison Clark as John Foster
Robert Homans as Police Lieutenant Daniel O'Day
Frank McGlynn Sr. as Blake
Pat Gleason as Red
Edward Keane as City Editor Gentry
Earle S. Dewey as Eddie Griffith
Milton Kibbee as Wheeler
Gene Roth as Mr. Joyce
George Kirby as Duckworth, the Butler
Norval Mitchell as Joe Seawell
John Valentine as Board Member
Jack Raymond as Mike, the Night Watchman
Parker Gee as Detective

References

Bibliography
 Fetrow, Alan G. Feature Films, 1940-1949: a United States Filmography. McFarland, 1994.

External links 

1944 films
American mystery films
American black-and-white films
Producers Releasing Corporation films
Films directed by Albert Herman
1944 mystery films
1940s English-language films
1940s American films